This is a list of Canadian television related events from 2006.

Events
{| class="wikitable"
|- bgcolor="#CCCCCC"
! Date || Event
|-
| March 21 || Cable channel talktv is rebranded as MTV.
|-
| April 2 || Mathieu Baron and Stéphanie Bélanger win the second season of Loft Story.
|-
| June 1 || Cable channel Prime is rebranded as TVtropolis.
|-
| July 12 || CTVglobemedia announces a $1.7 billion takeover offer for CHUM Limited.
|-
| September 17 || Eva Avila is named the winner of Canadian Idol's Season 4.
|-
| September 21 || CTV mistakenly airs Episode 3-02 of Grey's Anatomy in place of the season premiere.
|-
| November 4 || 2006 Gemini Awards.
|-
| December 3 || Jean-Philippe Anwar and Kim Rusk win season 3 of Loft Story.
|}

Debuts

Ending this year

Television shows

1950sCountry Canada (1954–2007)Hockey Night in Canada (1952–present, sports telecast)The National (1954–present, news program)

1960sCTV National News (1961–present)Land and Sea (1964–present)The Nature of Things (1960–present, scientific documentary series)Question Period (1967–present, news program)W-FIVE (1966–present, newsmagazine program)

1970sCanada AM (1972–present, news program)the fifth estate (1975–present, newsmagazine program)Marketplace (1972–present, newsmagazine program)100 Huntley Street (1977–present, religious program)

1980sCityLine (1987–present)Fashion File (1989–2009)Just For Laughs (1988–present)On the Road Again (1987–2007)Venture (1985–2007)

1990sCBC News Morning (1999–present)eTalk (1995–present, entertainment newsmagazine program)Life and Times (1996–2007)The Passionate Eye (1993–present)The Red Green Show (1991–2006)This Hour Has 22 Minutes (1992–present)

2000sAtomic Betty (2004–present, children's animated series)Billable Hours (2006–present)Les Bougon (2004–2006)Call for Help 2.0 (2004–2007, computer technical help series)Canadian Idol (2003–2008)Captain Flamingo (2006–2008, children's animated series)CBC News: Sunday Night (2004–present)Chilly Beach (2003–present, animated series)Class of the Titans (2005–2008, animated series)Corner Gas (2004–2009)Canada's Worst Driver (2005–present, reality series)Le Cœur a ses raisons (2005–present)The Collector (2004–2006)Da Vinci's City Hall (2005–2006)Degrassi: The Next Generation (2001–present)Doc Zone (2006–present)ET Canada (2005–present)Falcon Beach (2006–2007)Global Currents (2005–present, newsmagazine/documentary series)Grossology (2006–present, children's animated series)The Hour (2005–present, talk show)Instant Star (2004–2008)Intelligence (2005–2007)JR Digs (2001–present, comedy prank series)Kenny vs. Spenny (2002–2010, comedy reality series)Mantracker (2006–present, reality series)Metropia (2004–2006)Naked Josh (2004–2006)Naturally, Sadie (2005–2007)Odd Job Jack (animated series, 2003–present)Paradise Falls (2001–present)ReGenesis (2004–2008)Restaurant Makeover (2005–2008)Rick Mercer Report (2004–present)Robson Arms (2005–2008)6Teen (2004–present, animated series)Slings and Arrows (2003–2006)This Is Wonderland (2004–2006)Trailer Park Boys (2001–2008)Train 48 (2003–2005)What's with Andy (2001–2007, children's animated series)Whistler (2006–2008)

TV movies & miniseriesOctober 1970Prairie GiantRené Lévesque''

Television stations

Debuts

Network affiliation changes

References

See also
 2006 in Canada
 List of Canadian films of 2006